Mandip Sehmi (born 13 December 1980) is a British wheelchair rugby player.

He was part of the Great Britain national wheelchair rugby team that came in 4th place at the 2008 Summer Paralympics in Beijing, China.

He has three gold medals from the IWRF European Championship (2005, 2007 and 2015).

Sehmi was involved in a car crash in the summer of 2000, which resulted in a broken neck and a permanent spinal cord injury. He spent a year recovering at the Stoke Mandeville hospital.

While at the hospital, he had the opportunity to meet Bob O'Shea, a member of the Great Britain national wheelchair rugby team. O'Shea's wife was a nurse at the hospital, and he invited Sehmi to train in wheelchair rugby at a location near the hospital.

References

External links
 
 
Mandip Sehmi, team-2012.com
London 2012 mascots - Making of film 2 - with Mandip Sehmi at YouTube
 

1980 births
Living people
Paralympic wheelchair rugby players of Great Britain
Wheelchair rugby players at the 2008 Summer Paralympics
Wheelchair rugby players at the 2012 Summer Paralympics